The 2000 Princeton Tigers football team represented Princeton University in the 2000 NCAA Division I-AA football season. In their first year under head coach Roger Hughes, the team compiled a 3–7 record (3–4 against Ivy League opponents) and finished in fifth place in the Ivy League.  The team played its home games at Princeton Stadium in Princeton, New Jersey.

The John P. Poe - Richard W. Kazmaier, Jr. Football Trophy, given annually to "a member of the Princeton football team of good moral character, who, during the season in addition to proving himself a player of ability, has best
exemplified [specified] traits and characteristics," was awarded to seniors Michael F. Higgins and Dennis M. Norman.  Higgins was also the 2000 team captain.

Schedule

Game summaries

Lafayette

Sources:

On September 16, 2000, Princeton opened its season in its first game under head coach Roger Hughes.  The Tigers lost to Lafayette, 24-17.  The game was tied at 17 with nine seconds left, and Lafayette faced second down at the Princeton one-yard line.  Lafayette went for the touchdown and scored for the win.

Lehigh
On September 23, 2000, Princeton lost to #19 Lehigh, 20-18, at Princeton Stadium.  Lehigh scored 20 points in the first half and was held scoreless in the second half as the Tigers mounted a comeback effort.  The effort fell short, as Princeton was unable to score a touchdown and settled for six Taylor Northrop field goals, including a 50-yarder.  After the game, head coach Roger Hughes said, "I don't believe in moral victories, although, I'm very proud of how our kids played. Our kids played every snap of every quarter. I told them afterwards in the locker room that they have nothing to hang their heads about. [I told them] 'You became men today.'"

Columbia
On September 30, 2000, Princeton defeated Columbia, 27-24, with a field goal in overtime.  The game was the Ivy League opener for both teams.

Colgate
On October 7, 2000, Princeton lost to Colgate, 34-6. Princeton's Kyle Brandt rushed for 80 yards on 11 carries.

Brown
On October 14, 2000, Princeton defeated Brown, 55-28, in front of a crowd of 18,113 spectators. David Splithoff became the first freshman to start at quarterback in Princeton football history.  In his first start, Splithoff completed 13 of 17 passes for 289 yards and three touchdowns and led the Tigers to 514 yards of offense and 55 points.

Harvard
On October 21, 2000, Princeton lost to Harvard, 35-21, at Princeton Stadium. Harvard outgained Princeton 492 total yards to 294.  Princeton was also charged with 12 penalties. The loss to Harvard was the fifth in a row, representing Princeton's longest losing streak in the long history of the Harvard–Princeton football rivalry.

Cornell
On October 28, 2000, Princeton lost a close game to Cornell, 25-24.  Princeton scored a potential tying touchdown late with 11 seconds remaining, but kicker Taylor Northrop slipped on wet turf and missed the kick for point after touchdown.

Penn
On November 4, 2000, Princeton took an early lead, but Penn then scored 34 unanswered points and defeated the Tigers, 40-24.

Yale
On November 11, 2000, Princeton defeated Yale, 19-14. Yale took a 14-3 lead at halftime, but Princeton scored 16 unanswered points in the second half.  With 16 second remaining, Princeton scored the winning touchdown on a 32-yard pass from quarterback Jon Blevins to wide receiver Chisom Opara.

Dartmouth
On November 18, 2000, Princeton ended its season with a 42-37 loss against Dartmouth. Dartmouth quarterback Greg Smith completed 20 of 27 passes for 308 yards and four touchdowns. After the game, head coach Roger Hughes said the following about his team's seniors: "While I'm very saddened by losing them, I'm also excited about the future in that these seniors have given us a great foundation to build on."

Players
The following players won varsity letters for their participation in the 2000 Princeton football team:
Cameron T. Atkinson ’03
Gary N. Baumwoll ’02
Jonathan W. Blevins ’01
Kyle R. Brandt ’01
Andrew V. Bryant ’03
David B Camarillo ’01
Martin K. Cheatham ’01
Djordje D. Citovic ’01
Robert G. Currey ’03
Ismael H. El-Amin ’03
Robert E. Farrell ’02
Andrew D. Frank ’01
Nicholas A. Freitag ’01
Jonathan F. Ganter ’02
Michael F. Higgins ’01
Phillip E. Jackman ’02
Zakary A. Keasey ’04
Timothy A. Kirby ’04
Kevin A. Kongslie ’03
Steven G. Koopman ’01
Michael W. Long ’02
Timothy J. Ligue ’01
Jonathan E. Luick ’01
Blair W. Morrison ’04
Brandon P. Mueller ’04
Dennis M. Norman ’01
Taylor B. Northrop ’02
Chisomaga N. Opara ’03
John D. Owens ’01
J. Matthew Peluse ’02
C. Blake Perry ’04
Stephen P. Pierce ’01
Nathan P. Podsakoff ’01
John V. Raveche ’01
James A. Rogers ’03
Christopher S. Roser-Jones ’02
Jason M. Rotman ’01
Patrick C. Schottel ’03
Donald Scott ’03
Paul B. Simbi ’03
John M. Solic ’01
Aron E. Tremble ’01
Ross F. Tucker ’01
C. Clark Webb ’03
Joseph W. Weiss ’04
Brian P. Wilson ’01

References

Princeton
Princeton Tigers football seasons
Princeton Tigers football